Francisco Cerúndolo was the defending champion but chose not to defend his title.

Paul Jubb won the title after defeating Juan Pablo Varillas 6–3, 7–6(7–5) in the final.

Seeds

Draw

Finals

Top half

Bottom half

References

External links
Main draw
Qualifying draw

Santa Cruz Challenger II - 1